Shimao International Plaza is a  tall  skyscraper of 60 stories in Shanghai's Huangpu District. It was completed in 2006 under the design of Ingenhoven, Overdiek und Partner, East China Architecture and Design Institute.

Shimao International Plaza has two spires on its top, which make its total construction height to 333.3 metres. Most of the building (the upper 48 floors) houses, Conrad Shanghai, a luxury hotel with 728 rooms known as Le Royal Méridien Shanghai prior to January 1, 2022.. The building also includes a 9 floor shopping mall and 3 floors of exclusive clubs.

Shanghai Shimao Group bought the original developer of the tower, Wan Xiang Group, in 2001 and the name of the building was changed.

See also
 List of tallest buildings in Shanghai

References

External links
 
 
 

Buildings and structures completed in 2006
Huangpu District, Shanghai
Skyscraper office buildings in Shanghai
Skyscraper hotels in Shanghai